Las Palmas Air Base is a military airport in Santiago de Surco District, city of Lima, Peru. It is administered by the Peruvian Air Force (abbreviated FAP), one of three branches of the Peruvian Armed Forces.

The runway length does not include a  displaced threshold on Runway 02.

2019 Pan American Games
The air base was the stage for the shooting competitions at the 2019 Pan American Games.

See also
Transport in Peru
List of airports in Peru
Venues of the 2019 Pan American and Parapan American Games

References

External links
Direccion General de Aeronautica Civil: lista de aerodromos autorizados en el departamento de Lima (Spanish)
OurAirports - Las Palmas AB
SkyVector - Las Palmas
OpenStreetMap - Las Palmas

 
Buildings and structures in Lima
Venues of the 2019 Pan and Parapan American Games
Venues of the 2019 Pan American Games